The 2018 Slovak Cup Final (known as the Slovnaft Cup for sponsorship reasons) was the final match of the 2017–18 Slovak Cup, the 49th season of the top cup competition in Slovak football. The match was played at the Anton Malatinský Stadium in Trnava on 1 May 2018 between ŠK Slovan Bratislava and MFK Ružomberok.

Road to the final
Note: In all results below, the score of the finalist is given first (H: home; A: away).

Match

Details

See also
 2017–18 Slovak Cup
 2018–19 UEFA Europa League
 2018 Slovak Cup

References 

Slovak Cup Finals
2017–18 in Slovak football
Slovak Cup Final
Sport in Trnava
ŠK Slovan Bratislava matches
MFK Ružomberok matches